Footskating 101 is an independently produced, South African comedy film.

Plot 

In order to save his grandmother, his town, and his own skin, Vince, a poor miner's son, takes part in a skateboarding competition without a skateboard. He invents the extreme sport of footskating.

Production 
The film was independently produced.

Trivia 
 The film is dedicated to Brett Goldin, one of the original members of Crazy monkey, and avid footskater, who died in 2006. Originally, Goldin was meant to portray the role of Vince in the film.
 The film also stars Craig Archer as a crowd member, comedians John Vlismas, Rob van Vuuren, Kagiso Lediga and Riaad Moosa, Shaun "Worm" Brauteseth from the punk rock group The Finkelstiens, newsreader Reuben Goldberg, DJs Elana Afrika, Ian F and Sasha Martinengo, Isidingo actor Robert Whitehead and supermodel Kerry McGregor.

See also

Crazy Monkey presents Straight outta Benoni

Official sites
Official site

External links 
 

2007 films
South African independent films
2000s sports comedy films
2007 comedy films
English-language South African films
2000s English-language films